The Women's pole vault event  at the 2006 IAAF World Indoor Championships was held on March 10–11.

Medalists

Results

Qualification
Qualification: Qualification Performance 4.55 (Q) or at least 8 best performers (q) advanced to the final.

Final

References
Results

Pole
Pole vault at the World Athletics Indoor Championships
2006 in women's athletics